Bernard Alexander Hogan (18 November 1925 – 1 December 2006) was an Australian rules footballer who played for the Footscray Football Club in the Victorian Football League (VFL).

Notes

External links 
		

1925 births
Australian rules footballers from Victoria (Australia)
Western Bulldogs players
2006 deaths